Wellness is the second studio album by Australian indie rock band, Last Dinosaurs. The album was released on August 28, 2015 through Dew Process, and was announced alongside the album's second single, "Apollo", on April 30, 2015. Wellness debuted at number 18 in the Australian ARIA Charts.

Track listing

Charts

References 

Last Dinosaurs albums
Dew Process albums
2015 albums